State Route 247 (SR 247) is a  south–north state highway located in the central part of the U.S. state of Georgia. Its routing is within portions of Pulaski, Houston, and Bibb counties. It originates in the northwestern part of Hawkinsville, and it concludes in the northwestern section of Macon.

Route description
SR 247 commences at an intersection with US 129/US 341/SR 11 (Perry Highway) northwest of Hawkinsville, in Pulaski County. US 129/SR 247 head northwest concurrently, enter Houston County, and curve to the north at an intersection with SR 247 Spur, east of Perry. In Kathleen, Georgia is an intersection with SR 127. US 129/SR 247 meet SR 96 in Bonaire. In Warner Robins, across from Robins Air Force Base, is SR 247 Connector. The concurrency enters Bibb County before passing Middle Georgia Regional Airport a short distance south-southeast of an intersection with US 41/SR 11/SR 49. Those three highways join the concurrency to the north. The five highways later run through Rutland as they pass over a bridge for a former Central of Georgia Railway line, and then turn north again where they encounter an interchange with Houston Avenue, a former segment of US 41/SRs 11/49. From that point on, the street name along this concurrency is Houston Road. Later, the routes enters some marshland which includes bridges with Tobesofkee Creek and Rocky Creek before finally entering Macon, Georgia where it approaches a major intersection. US 41/SR 247 head to the northwest, Houston Avenue heads north, and US 129/SR 11/SR 49, as well as US 41 Business (which begins here), head to the northeast. US 41/SR 247 have an interchange with Interstate 75 (I-75) and SR 540. Farther to the north, they intersect US 80/SR 22, and then SR 74, before meeting US 41 Business/SR 19. There, US 41/SR 19 head northwest, while SR 247 heads north alone. It meets US 23/SR 87, just before meeting its northern terminus, a second interchange with I-75.

Major intersections

Special routes

State Route 247 Spur

State Route 247 Spur (SR 247 Spur) is a  spur route connecting US 341/SR 11 southeast of Perry with US 129/SR 247 east of the city.

SR 247 Spur isn't part of the National Highway System, a system of roadways important to the nation's economy, defense, and mobility.

State Route 247 Connector

State Route 247 Connector (SR 247 Connector) is a  connecting route of SR 247 that connects SR 49/SR 540 northeast of Fort Valley (in the unincorporated community of Powersville) with US 129/SR 247 in Warner Robins.

SR 247 Conn. isn't part of the National Highway System, a system of roadways important to the nation's economy, defense, and mobility.

See also

References

External links

 
 Georgia Roads (Routes 241 - 260)
 Georgia State Route 247 on State-Ends.com

247
Transportation in Pulaski County, Georgia
Transportation in Houston County, Georgia
Transportation in Bibb County, Georgia
Transportation in Macon, Georgia
Macon metropolitan area, Georgia